Sander Schutgens (born 31 December 1975 in Belfeld, Limburg) is a Dutch runner.

Career highlights

European Championships
2006 - Göteborg, 3rd, marathon nation classification
-(with Hugo van den Broek, Luc Krotwaar and Kamiel Maase)

Dutch National Championships
1998 - 1st, cross-country, short distance
2000 - 1st, cross-country, short distance
2005 - 1st, 5,000 m
2006 - 1st, 10,000 m

Personal bests

External links
IAAF profile for Sander Schutgens

1975 births
Living people
Dutch male long-distance runners
Dutch male marathon runners
Sportspeople from Venlo